This article contains information about the literary events and publications of 1818.

Events
January 1 – Mary Shelley's novel Frankenstein; or, the Modern Prometheus first appears anonymously in London. Its originality is praised by Walter Scott.
January 8 – Lord Byron, in Venice, sends the final part of Childe Harold to his publisher.
January 11 – Percy Bysshe Shelley's poem "Ozymandias" appears in Leigh Hunt's weekly The Examiner (London; p. 24) under the pen name "Glirastes". Horace Smith's contribution to the same informal sonnet-writing competition, "On a Stupendous Leg of Granite, Discovered Standing by Itself in the Deserts of Egypt, with the Inscription Inserted Below" is published on February 1 under his initials.
March 12 – Percy Bysshe Shelley, his wife Mary and her stepsister Claire Clairmont leave England for Italy, intending to take Claire's illegitimate child Alba to her father, Lord Byron. 
April 11 – John Keats and Samuel Taylor Coleridge take a walk on Hampstead Heath. In a letter to his brother George, Keats writes that they talked of "a thousand things... nightingales, poetry, poetical sensation, metaphysics."
May 11 – The Old Vic is founded as the Royal Coburg Theatre in South London by James King, Daniel Dunn and John Thomas Serres.
June – Last issue of The Portico: A Repository of Science & Literature is published in Baltimore with John Neal as editor.
 June–August – Keats with his friend Charles Armitage Brown makes a walking tour of Scotland, Ireland and the English Lake District. On July 11 while in Scotland he visits Burns Cottage, the birthplace of Robert Burns (1759–1796). Before Keats arrives, he writes to a friend "one of the pleasantest means of annulling self is approaching such a shrine as the cottage of Burns — we need not think of his misery — that is all gone — bad luck to it — I shall look upon it all with unmixed pleasure." but his encounter with the cottage's alcoholic custodian returns him to thoughts of misery. On August 2 he climbs to the summit of Ben Nevis, on which he writes a sonnet.
July
Thomas De Quincey begins 16 months as editor of a new weekly newspaper The Westmorland Gazette, published at Kendal in the English Lake District.
The Stephenson Blake type foundry begins operation in Sheffield, England.
July 18 – Walter Scott's historical novel The Heart of Midlothian appears as Tales of My Landlord, 2nd series, by "Jedediah Cleishbotham", in four volumes. A shipload of copies is sent from John Ballantyne (publisher) in Edinburgh to London.
August 28 – The National Library of Iceland is founded as Íslands stiftisbókasafn, at the instigation of a Danish antiquarian, Carl Christian Rafn, and the Icelandic Literary Society.
September 19 – Lord Byron writes to Thomas Moore that he has completed the first canto of Don Juan, begun on July 3.
November – Fanny Brawne first meets John Keats at the home of Charles Armitage Brown.
December 17 – Samuel Taylor Coleridge delivers a series of lectures on poetry, drama and philosophy, beginning with Shakespeare's The Tempest.
December – Keats is invited to move into Brown's home at Wentworth Place in Hampstead, at this time a pastoral suburb north of London, where he will write much of his most famous work.

New books

Fiction
Jane Austen (died 1817)
Northanger Abbey (completed 1803)
Persuasion (so dated, but issued December 1817)
Patrick Brontë (anonymous) – The Maid of Killarney
Selina Davenport – An Angel's Form and a Devil's Heart
Susan Edmonstone Ferrier – Marriage
Franz Grillparzer – Sappho
Ann Hatton – Secrets in Every Mansion
Mary Meeke – The Veiled Protectress
Sydney Owenson – Florence Macarthy: an Irish tale
Thomas Love Peacock (anonymous) – Nightmare Abbey
Anna Maria Porter – The Fast of St. Magdalen: a Romance
Walter Scott (as Jedediah Cleishbotham) – The Heart of Midlothian (Tales of My Landlord, 2nd series)
Mary Shelley (anonymously) – Frankenstein
Louisa Stanhope
The Bandit's Bride
The Nun of Santa Maria di Tindaro
Elizabeth Thomas – Woman, or Minor Maxims; a Sketch

Children
Maria Hack – Winter Evenings
Mary Martha Sherwood (anonymous) – The History of the Fairchild Family; or, The Child's Manual (Part I; Part II in 1842, Part III in 1847)

Drama
William Dimond – The Bride of Abydos
 John Dillon – Retribution
Franz Grillparzer – Sappho
 James Kenney – A Word to the Ladies
 Henry Hart Milman – Fazio
Silvio Pellico – Francesca da RiminiPoetry
Kristijonas Donelaitis – The SeasonsJohn Keats – EndymionThomas Bowdler – The Family Shakspeare (2nd bowdlerized edition expanded from 1807 edition)
John Neal – Battle of Niagara, a Poem, without Notes; and Goldau, or the Maniac HarperPercy Bysshe ShelleyOzymandiasThe Revolt of Islam (so dated, but issued December 1817)
Elizabeth Thomas (anonymous) – The Confession, or, The Novice of St Clare, and other PoemsNon-fiction
Elizabeth Beverley – Modern Times, "sermon" prompted by death of Princess Charlotte of Wales
Josef Dobrovský – Geschichte der böhmischen Sprache und Literatur (Dějiny českého jazyka a literatury, History of the Czech Language)
John Evelyn (died 1706) – Diary (selection; diary covers 1641–1697)
Henry Hallam – The View of the State of Europe during the Middle AgesWilliam Hazlitt – Lectures on the English PoetsJames Mill – The History of British IndiaCharles Mills – History of MohammedanismCollin de Plancy – Dictionnaire InfernalArthur Schopenhauer – The World as Will and Representation (Die Welt als Wille und Vorstellung)''

Births
January 14 – Zachris Topelius, Swedish-language Finnish novelist (died 1898)
February – Frederick Douglass, African-American abolitionist, author and orator (died 1895)
April 23 – James Anthony Froude, English religious controversialist and historian (died 1894)
May 5 – Karl Marx, German philosopher (died 1883)
May 25 – Jacob Burckhardt, Swiss historian (died 1897)
July 30 – Emily Brontë, English novelist and poet (died 1848)
August 3 – Mary Bell Smith, American educator, social reformer, and writer (died 1894)
November 9 (October 28 OS) – Ivan Turgenev, Russian novelist and playwright (died 1883)

Deaths
January 11 – Johann David Wyss, Swiss children's author writing in German (born 1743)
March 6 – John Gifford, English political writer (born 1758)
May 14 – Matthew Lewis, English novelist and dramatist (born 1775)
June 11 – Elizabeth Bonhôte, English novelist, essayist and poet (born 1744)
October 22 – Joachim Heinrich Campe, German linguist and publisher (born 1746)
November 6 – Malcolm Laing, Scottish historian (born 1762)
December 7 – Mary Brunton, Scottish novelist (born 1778)

Awards
Newdigate Prize – T. H. Ormerod

References

 
Years of the 19th century in literature